Robert John Ash  (born September 29, 1943) is a Canadian former professional ice hockey defenceman.  He played 200 games in the World Hockey Association with the Winnipeg Jets and Indianapolis Racers, scoring six goals and 46 assists.

Awards and achievements
MJHL First All-Star Team  (1964)
Turnbull Cup MJHL Championship (1962, 1963, & 1964)

References

External links

1943 births
Brandon Wheat Kings players
Buffalo Bisons (AHL) players
Canadian ice hockey defencemen
Ice hockey people from Saskatchewan
Indianapolis Racers players
Living people
Omaha Knights (CHL) players
Providence Reds players
Seattle Totems (WHL) players
Winnipeg Jets (WHA) players